Asadabad-e Vosta (also Romanized as Asadābād-e Vostá) is a village in Nurali Rural District, in the Central District of Delfan County, Lorestan Province, Iran. At the 2006 census, its population was 95, in 19 families.

References 

Towns and villages in Delfan County